San Martín Huamelulpam is a town and municipality in Oaxaca in south-western Mexico. It is part of the Tlaxiaco District in the south of the Mixteca Region.

As of 2005, the municipality had a total population of 1012.

References

Municipalities of Oaxaca